The slender lorises (Loris) are a genus of loris native to India and Sri Lanka. The genus comprises two species, the red slender loris found in Sri Lanka and the gray slender loris from Sri Lanka and India. Slender lorises spend most of their life in trees, traveling along the tops of branches with slow and precise movements. They are found in tropical rainforests, scrub forests, semi-deciduous forests, and swamps. The primates have lifespans of approximately 15 years and are nocturnal. Slender lorises generally feed on insects, reptiles, plant shoots, and fruit.

Taxonomy 

The type species was named Lemur tardigradus by Linnaeus in 1758. The name Loris is first reported Georges-Louis Leclerc, Comte de Buffon in 1765, representing the Dutch loeris meaning "clown". According to Buffon, the name loeris had been in use for some time by Dutch naturalists for the "sloths of Ceylon".

The genus Loris was separated from lemurs by Étienne Geoffroy Saint-Hilaire (1796), based on a suggestion of a Lorican genus by Louis-Jean-Marie Daubenton (1792). Saint-Hilaire's Loris at first included  Daubenton's type species, Loris de Buffon, which he however delegated to the new Nycticebus genus in 1812.

 Family Lorisidae
 Subfamily Perodicticinae: African lorisids
 Subfamily Lorisinae: Asian lorisids
 Genus Loris
 Red slender loris, Loris tardigradus
 Gray slender loris, Loris lydekkerianus
 Genus Nycticebus: slow lorises
 Genus Xanthonycticebus: pygmy slow loris

Distribution and habitat 

The red slender loris is found in Sri Lanka while the gray slender loris is found in Sri Lanka and India. The two subspecies of red slender loris differ in their habitat preference, the lowland loris, L. t. tardigradus, favors wet lowland forests (up to 470 m above sea level) in the south western wet-zone of Sri Lanka while the mountain loris, L. t. nycticeboides, prefers cloud, montane, and highland evergreen forests at elevations of 1800–2300 m. The gray slender loris can be found in tropical rainforests, primary and some secondary, coastal acacia scrub forests, semi-evergreen forests, swamps, and bamboo groves up to 2000 m above sea level.

Behaviour 
Female slender lorises generally have an exclusive home range while males may overlap with others. They often form small social groups to sleep, containing adults of both sexes as well as the young. The groups also undertake mutual grooming and play wrestling. The adults typically hunt separately during the night. Males will follow females while they are in oestrus and mating may occur after a bout of play fighting. Gray slender lorises will often bear twins but the survival rate is low. Newborn infants cling to the mother's front for a few weeks and after that will be kept on a tree while the mother goes off to feed.They make nests out of leaves or find hollows of trees or a similar secure place to live in.

Diet 

The slender lorises are one of the most faunivorous primates; the red slender loris has only been observed eating animal prey while the gray slender loris is primarily carnivorous (mostly insects) but will also eat bird eggs, berries, leaves, buds and occasionally invertebrates as well as geckos and lizards. To maximize protein and nutrient uptake they consume every part of their prey, including the scales and bones. They are able to digest toxic prey such as ants and noxious beetles, urinating on their hands before entering ant colonies to mimic the chemical profile of their prey to avoid attack.

Threats 

According to biologists, poaching activity has led to the steady decline of the species in Tamil Nadu. Native people have always believed that all parts of the slender loris have some medicinal or magical powers. This has contributed greatly to the decline of the slender loris. In addition, slender lorises are illegally smuggled to supply a growing exotic pet trade. Other threats include habitat loss, electrocution on live wires, and road accidents. Along the western region of Tamil Nadu, there is a vigorous clampdown on illegal poaching of slender lorises.

Destruction of tropical rain forest habitat is also contributing to declines in population.

IUCN has listed them as Endangered, whereas they are listed under the Schedule I of the Wildlife (Protection) Act of India, 1972, according them the highest level of legal protection. WWF-India is working to protect the habitats of the Slender Loris through its wider conservation work in the Western Ghats - Nilgiris Landscape.

Kadavur Slender Loris Sanctuary 
Kadavur Slender Loris Sanctuary was declared as India's first Slender Loris Sanctuary. It is located in Karur and Dindigul districts of Tamilnadu.

References 

Lorises
Mammals of India
Mammals of Sri Lanka
Taxa named by Étienne Geoffroy Saint-Hilaire